Lawrence O'Toole may refer to:

Lorcán Ua Tuathail, Irish archbishop and Roman Catholic saint
Lawrence O'Toole (journalist), Canadian film critic and memoirist